H. Johannes Wallmann (born 23 February 1952, in Leipzig) is a contemporary composer and integral artist. His works cover compositions for landscape sound and three-dimensional sound, chamber music and orchestra. as well as  musical combination and self organisation systems. He developed the basis for a new aesthetic theory and terminated after many years 2005 the work on a book with the title: Integrale Moderne – Vision und Philosophie zur Kultur, Demokratie und Ökonomie der Zukunft ("Integral modern trends – vision and philosophy for the culture, democracy and economics of the future").

Works 

 "GLOCKEN REQUIEM DRESDEN - Komposition für 129 vernetzte Dresdner Kirchenglocken" (“BELLS REQUIEM DRESDEN - composition for 129 networked Dresden church-bells")
 "KLANG FELSEN HELGOLAND - Landschaftsklang-Komposition" (“SOUND ROCK HELGOLAND - landscape sound composition”) 
 "INNENKLANG-AUSSENKLANG - Musik im Raum für 4 Orchestergruppen, Soprane und Soundscapes" (“INTERIORSOUND-COUNTERSINK-LONG - music in space for 4 orchestral groups, sopranos and soundscapes”) Broadcast Symphony Orchestra Berlin
 "intars 2138" - Dresden Philharmonic Orchestra 
 Lichtklang-Landschaft "der grüne klang" (Light sound landscape “the green sound”) 
 MAN-DO - Musik im Raum für 6 Instrumentalgruppen" ("Music in space for 6 instrumental groups") Berlin Philharmonic Orchestra 
 DER BLAUE KLANG - Landschaftsklang-Komposition für voneinander weitentfernte Vokal- und Orchestergruppen für die "Wörlitzer Anlagen" (The BLUE SOUND - landscape sound composition for widely separated vocal and orchestral groups for the “Wörlitzer plants”) 
 "GLOCKEN REQUIEM XXI für drei voneinander weitentfernte Chorgruppen, 137 Glocken und elektronische Klänge" (“BELLS REQUIEM XXI for three widely spaced groups of choirs, 137 bells and electronic sounds”)

Bibliography 
 Integrale Moderne - Vision und Philosophie der Zukunft,

References

External links
 Integral Art

German composers
Pupils of Friedrich Goldmann
Living people
1952 births